The 1963 National Soccer League season was the fortieth season under the National Soccer League (NSL) name. The season began in late April and concluded in late October with Toronto Ukrainia defeating Toronto Hakoah for the O’Keefe Trophy (NSL Championship). The regular-season title was won by Italian Virtus by finishing first throughout the regular season.

Overview 
The creation of the Eastern Canada Professional Soccer League (ECPSL) in 1961 directly affected the National Soccer League (NSL) financially. The competition including the defection of the top NSL clubs to the ECPSL caused a major decrease in their match attendance throughout the early 1960s. Their drop-in the gate earnings at Stanley Park Stadium contributed to their failure in fully paying their tax and loan payments. The club members successfully managed to pay off their taxes from the 1961 season and received an extension from the Toronto Board of Control for the remainder of their debt. The Board of Control further intervened by volunteering to serve as a mediator between the ECPSL and NSL, with intentions of merging both leagues as a solution to the NSL's financial issues. The NSL had hoped to create a two-tiered league with a promotion and relegation format, but the proposal was rejected by the ECPSL ownership.  

League membership decreased from twelve to eight members with several notable clubs departing. A keynoted departure was charter member Toronto Ulster United, which decided to join the amateur ranks in the Toronto and District Soccer League due to financial difficulties. Oshawa Italia and Oshawa Hungaria also returned to the amateur level and Queen City disbanded their team. Toronto Hakoah, a Jewish-sponsored team was the sole addition to the circuit. Though the season began with eight members Toronto Macedonians withdrew from the competition, due to financial difficulties and the inability to afford quality players to remain competitive. Several of the top players in the NSL were reported to have been earning $100 a week while in the ECPSL top players were earning about $200 per week. 

Changes occurred at the administrative side midway through the season as Walter Freer resigned as league president and was succeeded by vice-president Bill Boytchuk. A league scoring record was also recorded by Toronto Ukrainia after defeating Toronto Macedonians by a score of 16-1.

Teams

Standings

Playoffs

Semifinals    

 
Toronto Hakoah won the series 2-0.

Toronto Ukrainia won the series 2-0.

Finals

References

External links
RSSSF CNSL page
thecnsl.com - 1963 season

1963–64 domestic association football leagues
National Soccer League
1963